Jana Thieme (born 6 July 1970) is a German rower and Olympic champion.

Thieme travelled to Barcelona for the 1992 Summer Olympics as a substitute but did not compete. She competed at the 1996 Summer Olympics. She won a gold medal in double sculls with her partner Kathrin Boron at the 2000 Sydney Olympic Games.

Thieme has won six World Championships and nine German Championships.

References

External links
 
 

1970 births
Living people
German female rowers
Olympic rowers of Germany
Rowers at the 1996 Summer Olympics
Rowers at the 2000 Summer Olympics
Olympic gold medalists for Germany
Olympic medalists in rowing
Medalists at the 2000 Summer Olympics
World Rowing Championships medalists for East Germany
World Rowing Championships medalists for Germany
People from Beeskow
Sportspeople from Brandenburg
21st-century German women
20th-century German women